Angel's petite gecko (Paragehyra petiti) is a species of lizard in the family Gekkonidae. The species is endemic to Madagascar.

Etymology
The specific name, petiti, is in honor of French ornithologist Louis Petit, fils (1856-1943).

Geographic range
P. petiti is found in southwestern Madagascar, in the area that was formerly called Toliara Province.

Habitat
The preferred habitats of P. petiti are forest and rocky areas at altitudes near sea level.

Reproduction
P. petiti is oviparous.

References

Further reading
Angel F (1929). "Description d'un gecko nouveau, de Madagascar ". Bulletin de la Société Zoologique de France 54: 489–491. (Paragehyra petiti, new species). (in French).
Glaw F, Schmidt K (2003). "Beobachtungen an Paragehyra petiti, einem lange Zeit verschollenen Gecko aus Madagaskar (Sauria: Gekkonidae)". Gekkota 4: 34–39. (in German).
Glaw F, Vences M (1994). A Fieldguide to the Amphibians and Reptiles of Madagascar, Second Edition. Cologne, Germany: Vences & Glaw Verlag / Serpents Tale. 480 pp. . (Paragehyra petiti, p. 277).
Rösler H (1995). Geckos der Welt: Alle Gattungen. Leipzig, Germany: Urania Verlag. 256 pp. . (Paragehyra petiti, p. 139). (in German).

Paragehyra
Reptiles of Madagascar
Reptiles described in 1929